Johnny Bo Andersen (born 22 November 1963) is a Danish lightweight rower. He won a gold medal at the 1992 World Rowing Championships in Montreal with the lightweight men's eight.

References

1963 births
Living people
Danish male rowers
World Rowing Championships medalists for Denmark